Imeni Panfilova is a village in Almaty Region, in south-eastern Kazakhstan.

References

External links 
 Satellite Map of Imeni Panfilova

Populated places in Almaty Region